The 1999–2000 OB I bajnokság season was the 63rd season of the OB I bajnokság, the top level of ice hockey in Hungary. Seven teams participated in the league, and Dunaferr SE Dunaujvaros won the championship.

First round

Second round

Group A

Group B

Playoffs

3rd place 
 Gyor HC - Alba Volán Székesfehérvár 4:13

Final 
 Dunaferr SE Dunaújváros - Ferencvárosi TC 4:0 (5:0, 3:2, 5:3, 4:1)

External links 
 Season on hockeyarchives.info

OB I bajnoksag seasons
Hun
OB